Wadaigudem is a village in Yadadri Bhuvanagiri district of Telangana, India. It falls under Bhuvanagiri mandal.

References

Villages in Yadadri Bhuvanagiri district